Liesl is a feminine given name of German origin. It is a diminutive of Lieselotte and Elisabeth. Notable people with the name include:

Liesl Herbst 1903–1990), Austrian tennis player
Liesl Jobson, South African poet
Liesl Karlstadt (1892–1960), German actress and cabaret performer
Liesl Perkaus (1905–1987), Austrian track and field athlete
Liesl Ischia, Australian diver
Liesl Seewald, Austrian luger
Liesl Tommy, South African-American director

Fictional characters
Liesl von Trapp, a character in The Sound of Music and fictionalized version of Agathe von Trapp

German feminine given names
Feminine given names
Swiss feminine given names